is a Japanese Nippon Professional Baseball pitcher for the Hanshin Tigers in Japan's Central League.

Early baseball career
Kōki started playing little league baseball for the Tamashima Minami Elementary School and his team won runner up in the Okayama Prefectural Tournament during his 5th grade. He initially started as an outfielder, but switched to a pitching role when he played for Kurosaki Junior High. He went on to become the ace pitcher of Kurashiki Technical High, but his team never made it to either Spring Koshien or Summer Koshien.

When he went undrafted after graduation, he joined the Industrial Leagues under Honda Suzuka. He spent his first 2 years mostly in the dug out due to injuries, but in the succeeding year, he came to the rescue as a reliever in a crucial match against JR Tokai and helped his team reach the final round of the 2014 Intercity Baseball Tournament.

Hanshin Tigers
He was chosen as the Hanshin Tigers' 4th round pick in the 2014 Nippon Professional Baseball draft. He signed a 50 million yen contract with the Tigers, with an estimated 8.4 million yen annual salary. He was assigned the jersey number 43.

References

External links

NPB Stats

Living people
1993 births
Hanshin Tigers players
Japanese baseball players
Nippon Professional Baseball pitchers
Baseball people from Okayama Prefecture
People from Kurashiki